Sudden Death Seven-ball (also known as ESPN Sudden Death Seven-ball for promotional purposes) was an annual pool tournament (and television show) held in the United States; it was broadcast on and sponsored by ESPN. SDSB was the most notable event featuring the game of seven-ball. It was usually held (in a variable location each year) at the same time as Trickshot Magic, another annual televised pool tournament.

The event series was short-lived: After six events, 2000 – 2005, the tournament was never again staged. There's a possibility that it might have been replaced by the International Speed Pool Tournament, a new cue sport event that started taking place simultaneously with Trickshot Magic in 2006.

Format
Each year, eight notable players were invited to compete in this single elimination event. 

Every match had two sets, both of race-to-7. To win, a player has to win both. In the event of a draw, the players went into a single rack decider to determine a winner.

If a player failed to pocket a ball, the other player was awarded ball-in-hand. To prevent this from occurring, players could call a safety once per rack.

The seven-ball had to be called before being pocketed. Failing to call it or calling a pocket other than where landed would result in the seven-ball being re-spotted and player at the table losing his turn. Also, winning by pocketing the seven-ball early wasn't permitted.

Prize money distribution
The total purse of the tournament was US$40,000, distributed in the following ratio:

Champions

References

External links
 Last rack footage of Bustamante-Immonen seven-ball match

Pool competitions
Defunct sports competitions
Recurring events disestablished in 2005